Tone Norum (born 18 September 1965) is a Swedish pop singer who gained popularity in the 1980s and 1990s, scoring several chart successes in Sweden. She is the younger sister of John Norum, the guitarist from the rock band Europe.

Biography
Tone Norum was born in Vardø, Norway, but her family moved to Sweden when she was still a baby.

Her debut album, One of a Kind, was released in 1986. It was written and produced by Europe vocalist Joey Tempest, featured guest appearances by Europe members John Norum, Ian Haugland and Mic Michaeli, and included hits like "Stranded" and "Can't You Stay?". Her second album, This Time, featured another hit, the vocal duet "Allt som jag känner" with Tommy Nilsson, and a guest appearance by Yngwie Malmsteen on the song "Point of No Return". Her 1990 album, Red, was produced by her then husband/musician/producer Max Lorentz. Norum's 1992 hit, "Don't Turn Around", was a cover of the Tina Turner song.

The last appearance of Tone Norum was in the tribute album to the Swedish singer Alf Robertson Till Alf Robertson Med Kärlek (2011), with the song "Om Du Har Ett Hjärta".

Discography

Albums

Singles

References

1965 births
Living people
Swedish women singers
Swedish people of Norwegian descent
People from Vardø